Tracy Ann Wormworth (born December 15, 1958) is an American bass guitarist.  

Wormworth is a member of the B-52s. She has recorded and toured with the band since the Cosmic Tour of 1990. She played on their sixth studio album, 1992's Good Stuff, and recorded on the band's soundtrack for the 1994 movie "The Flintstones". By 2008, she was listed as an official band member on their album Funplex; she is featured in the 2011 video recording With the Wild Crowd! Live in Athens, GA.

Wormworth's career began as a member of The Waitresses, a New Wave band out of Akron, Ohio. She joined the band after the departure of bassist Dave Hofstra, who played on the Waitresses' first album, Wasn't Tomorrow Wonderful? (though Wormworth appears in the back cover photo on the album). She remained with the band until it dissolved in 1984.

Wormworth has served as a touring bass player for Sting and Wayne Shorter, Cyndi Lauper, Phyllis Hyman, jazz violinist Regina Carter, vocalists Rachelle Ferrell and Joan Osborne. She was part of the house band on The Rosie O'Donnell Show, where she performed with Little Richard, Liza Minnelli, and many other artists. She appears in videos with The B-52s and Sting. She also recorded on the Lena Horne album We'll Be Together Again (1994), I Ain't Movin' (1994) by singer-songwriter Des'ree, Head over Heels (1995) by Paula Abdul, and Regina Carter's Something for Grace. She has worked with The Family Stand, Rachel Z, and Moby.

She is the sister of The Conan O'Brien Show drummer James Wormworth, daughter of jazz drummer Jimmy Wormworth, and sister of vocalist Mary Wormworth.

Discography

With Paula Abdul
Head over Heels (Virgin/Captive, 1995)
With The B-52's
Good Stuff (Reprise, 1992)
Funplex (Astralwerks, 2008)
With the Wild Crowd! Live in Athens, GA (Eagle, 2011)
With Des'ree
I Ain't Movin' (Epic/550, 1994
With Lena Horne
We'll Be Together Again (Blue Note, 1994)
With Houston Person
The Opening Round (Savant, 1997)
With David Lee Roth
Diamond Dave (Magna Carta, 2003)
With The Waitresses
Christmas Wrapping (ZE, 1981)
Wasn't Tomorrow Wonderful? (Polydor, 1982)
I Could Rule the World If I Could Only Get the Parts (Polydor, 1982)
Bruiseology (Polydor, 1983)

References

Living people
1958 births
American rock bass guitarists
African-American guitarists
Women bass guitarists
The Waitresses members
Place of birth missing (living people)